Heteropan is a genus of moths belonging to the family Zygaenidae.

The species of this genus are found in Southeastern Asia.

Species
Species:

Heteropan agriolina 
Heteropan alberti 
Heteropan albicosta 
Heteropan albicruciata 
Heteropan alienus 
Heteropan analis 
Heteropan anisus 
Heteropan apicalis 
Heteropan appendiculata 
Heteropan coeruleus 
Heteropan cupreatus 
Heteropan cyaneus 
Heteropan difformis 
Heteropan dolens 
Heteropan eremophila 
Heteropan fuscescens 
Heteropan iscatus 
Heteropan lutulenta 
Heteropan lycaenoides 
Heteropan rubricollum 
Heteropan scintillans 
Heteropan submacula 
Heteropan truncata

References

Zygaenidae
Zygaenidae genera